Dudgeon is a surname. Notable people with the surname include:

 Cecil Dudgeon, politician
 Gus Dudgeon, record producer
 James Dudgeon, footballer
 Joe Dudgeon, English footballer
 John Dudgeon, physician
 Neil Dudgeon, actor
 Patrick Dudgeon, mineralogist
 Richard Dudgeon, mechanic
 Robert Ellis Dudgeon, physician

See also

 Dudgeon (steam automobile company) named after its founder Richard Dudgeon
 J & W Dudgeon, Victorian ship builders
 Dudgeon dagger, another name for a bollock dagger
 Dudgeon Bank, area off the coast of Norfolk, site of proposed Dudgeon Offshore Wind Farm
 Dudgeoneidae, a family and genus (Dudgeonea) of moths sometimes called Dudgeon moths